Donald Bissa (born 13 December 1991) is an Ivorian-born Indonesian professional footballer who plays as a striker for Liga 1 club PSM Makassar.

Club career

Deltras Sidoarjo
Promised by Deltras Sidoarjo to be paid three months' debt halfway through 2013, he lacked the wherewithal to return to Ivory Coast to celebrate Eid al-Fitr with his family that August as he had still not received the payment.

Martapura FC
Included with Martapura at the 2018 Indonesia President's Cup, Bissa picked up an injury despite contributing two goals in a practice game with Porprov Kukar, recovering in time for their final Group B clash with Kalteng Putra.

PSM Makassar
He was signed for PSM Makassar to play in Liga 1 in the 2022 season. Bissa made his league debut on 2 September 2022 in a match against Persik Kediri at the Brawijaya Stadium, Kediri. On 5 December 2022, Bissa made his first goal for the club in Liga 1, earning them a 2–0 win over Persikabo 1973.

References

External links
 Donald Bissa at Liga Indonesia

1991 births
Living people
Ivorian footballers
Indonesian footballers
Association football forwards
PSAP Sigli players
Deltras F.C. players
PSIR Rembang players
PSBL Langsa players
Zwegabin United F.C. players
Dewa United F.C. players
Hanthawaddy United F.C. players
PS Barito Putera players
PSM Makassar players
Indonesian Premier Division players
Myanmar National League players
Liga 1 (Indonesia) players
Ivorian expatriate footballers
Expatriate footballers in Indonesia
Ivorian expatriate sportspeople in Indonesia
Expatriate footballers in Myanmar
Ivorian expatriate sportspeople in Myanmar
People from Abengourou
Naturalised citizens of Indonesia